Lawrence Richards Pomeroy (June 2, 1925, Sayre, Pennsylvania – March 26, 2020, Burlington, North Carolina) was a zoologist, ecologist, and oceanographer.

Biography
His family lived in Watkins Glen, New York, until they moved in the mid 1930s to Pass-a-Grille, Florida. As a high school student at St. Petersburg High School, he wrote a nature column for the local newspaper and worked as a crew member of the commercial fishing boat Wye Goodie. At the University of Michigan he graduated in zoology with a B.S. in 1947 and an M.S. in 1948. At Rutgers University he received in 1951 a Ph.D. in marine science. His doctoral dissertation on the physiology of oysters was supervised by Harold Haley "Hal" Haskin (1915–2002). As a postdoc Pomeroy worked at New Jersey's Oyster Research Laboratory (later renamed the Haskin Shellfish Research Laboratory). From 1954 to 1960 he worked at the University of Georgia Marine Institute, located on Sapelo Island and founded in 1953. In 1960 he became a faculty member in the University of Georgia's zoology department and moved with his family to Athens, Georgia.

Robert E. Johannes (1936–2002) and Pomeroy planned and led the 1971 Symbios Expedition to Enewetak Atoll in the Marshall Islands. The expedition lasted two months. The research vessel R/V Alpha Helix and shore-based facilities provided laboratory and logistical support. During the expedition the research vessel was docked at a pier located on Japtan Island in the Marshall Islands. The expedition, with an interdisciplinary crew of 25 ecologists and oceanographers, set a new standard for comprehensive study of a coral reef.

In April 1952 in New Jersey he married Janet Klerk (1929–2009). Upon his death he was survived by his daughter, his son, and three grandchildren.

Awards and honors
 1958 — Fellow of the American Association for the Advancement of Science
 1969 — Antarctica Service Medal from the National Science Foundation
 1983–1984 — President of the Association for the Sciences of Limnology and Oceanography
 1987 — G. Evelyn Hutchinson Award from the Association for the Sciences of Limnology and Oceanography
 1989 — A.G. Huntsman Award for Excellence in the Marine Sciences from the Royal Society of Canada
 2001 — Odum Lifetime Achievement Award from the Coastal and Estuarine Research Federation (CERF)

Selected publications

 (over 1500 citations)

as editor

References

1925 births
2020 deaths
American ecologists
American oceanographers
20th-century American zoologists
21st-century American zoologists
Systems ecologists
University of Michigan alumni
Rutgers University alumni
University of Georgia faculty
Fellows of the American Association for the Advancement of Science